Frauke Petry (born 1 June 1975) is a German politician who chaired the Alternative for Germany (AfD) party from July 2015 to September 2017. A chemist by training and with a professional background as a businesswoman, some political scientists described Petry as a representative of the national conservative wing of that party.

Petry had formerly served as one of three party spokespersons from 2013 to 2015, and became leader in 2015, displacing the party's founder Bernd Lucke after an internal power struggle; Lucke subsequently left the party and said it has "fallen irretrievably into the wrong hands" after Petry's election. Petry left the party in turn after stating it had become "anarchical" and unable to provide a "credible platform".

Petry is noted for her anti-Islam views, for her calls to ban minarets, and for arguing that German police should "use firearms if necessary" to prevent illegal border-crossings. She led the Blue Party until its dissolution in late 2019.

Early life 
Petry was born on 1 June 1975 to a chemist and an engineer in Dresden in what was then East Germany. She lived in Schwarzheide, Brandenburg, near Saxony until the fall of the Berlin wall in 1989, after which her family moved to Bergkamen in Westphalia. Petry took her first degree in chemistry at the University of Reading, England, in 1998, before attending the University of Göttingen, from where she gained a doctorate in 2004. She was supported by a scholarship of the Studienstiftung.

Political orientation 
Petry was described as a representative of the national conservative wing of her party. To the contrary, political scientist Cas Mudde described her as a representative of the far-right wing of her party. Petry describes herself as national-conservative and supporting policies of "national self-determinism". Der Spiegel reports that her electoral success on 4 July 2015, which gave her the reins of leadership in the AfD in preference to Bernd Lucke (the party's founder) was made possible by the national-conservative wing of the party. Lucke's wing did not have the majority.

On the subject of the political spectrum, Petry has said, "Right and left are terms that haven't fitted for a long time". Petry believes sharia is incompatible with the "democratic and liberal order of state" and has said that the majority within her AfD favors a liberal-conservative policy.

Border control 
In January 2016, when a reporter from the regional newspaper Mannheimer Morgen asked her about European and German border policies, Petry answered that the German Border police must do their jobs by "hindering illegal entry of refugees". Petry suggested that the border police could "use firearms if necessary" to "prevent illegal border crossings", a statement which contradicts the Convention Relating to the Status of Refugees. The reporter followed up on her response, using the term Schiessbefehl which means "order to shoot". Petry stated that she did not use that term, going on to state that no policeman "wants to fire on a refugee and I don't want that either" but that border police must follow the law to maintain the integrity of European borders. Afterwards, Petry made several attempts to justify these statements.

Male circumcision 
In a rough draft of its manifesto, the AfD had considered adopting a stance stating that male circumcision should be outlawed, but Petry said in her interview with Tim Sebastian on 21 March 2016 that this language would not be in the final draft. The Central Council of Jews in Germany is also in an uproar over the question of religious circumcision, stating that to give precedence to a child's self-determination over his parents' right of freedom of religion is "an unprecedented and dramatic intrusion on the right to self-determination of religious communities". This national dialogue is happening in the wake of a 2012 decision of a Higher Regional Court in Cologne, which called the circumcision of a 4-year-old boy "bodily harm".

Women in society 
Unlike the SPD, Petry does not believe mandatory quotas are the right way to give opportunities to women, nor does she believe they improve the chances of women having more leadership positions. She believes quotas make women unsure of whether a promotion would be made on the basis of qualifications.

Regarding the issue of burqas, Petry believes it should not be compulsory for women to dress in such a manner. She has said that in schools "this sort of religious costume should not be worn".

Migration 
On the issue of international migration, Petry is of the view that, "We [Germany and the rest of Europe] have to decide what sort of migration we want to accept". She has said, "Deciding about who's migrating and who's not, who's going to be part of a new country is, in the end, a question of borders, whether you see them, or whether you don't. When I go to France, I don't see the border, but I know it's there and I accept it, be it in terms of speed limits, or be it in terms of laws and legislation".

Resignation from AfD
In April 2017, Petry stepped down as AfD's candidate for chancellor due to reports that she wanted to change the party's policies to appeal to more moderate voters. This came after she had frequently criticised Björn Höcke, a party representative who had called the Holocaust Memorial in Berlin a "monument of shame", and backed attempts to expel him, but could not prevail in a power struggle with her party rivals Jörg Meuthen and Alexander Gauland, who accused her of splitting party ranks. Despite the internal strife, her party voted to allow her to run for a seat in the German parliament in the September 2017 elections.

One day after election night in which Petry was elected to the Bundestag by direct mandate, she left an AfD press conference saying that she won't join the party's parliamentary group in the Bundestag because the party became too "anarchical" and "could not offer a credible platform". Alice Weidel, the AfD's frontrunner, demanded her resignation from the party. Petry will join the Bundestag as an independent politician. She resigned from the party and all offices on 29 September 2017. She was subsequently charged with perjury for allegedly lying under oath about her former party's finances. She was convicted and sentenced to a fine of 6,000 euros. In 2020, the Federal Court of Justice overturned the conviction on the grounds that the law on perjury did not apply to the context in which she made the false statements.

On 12 October 2017, Petry announced that she would form a new party, called the Blue Party, which would provide a "reasonable conservative" agenda and seek to replicate the success of the Bavarian Christian Social Union. In late 2019, that party was dissolved.

Personal life
In 2007, Petry founded her own business, PURinvent, a Leipzig-based manufacturer of polyurethane tire fill products. She received the Medal of the Order of Merit in 2012.
 
Petry separated from her husband, Sven Petry, a Lutheran pastor, in October 2015, stating that this was by mutual consent and that the two remained friends and would continue to share in the upbringing of their four children. Frauke Petry also revealed that "much more than just friendly feelings" had developed between her and Marcus Pretzell, a fellow AfD party member. At about the same time, it was announced that Sven Petry had joined the CDU. In December 2016, Petry married Pretzell, by then her domestic partner. Having had two further children with Pretzell, Petry now has six altogether and lives in Tautenhain, Saxony.

Petry is a member of the Evangelical-Lutheran Church of Saxony, a member church of the Evangelical Church in Germany (EKD). She criticizes many stances of the EKD, which historically holds a largely liberal Protestant stance, claiming it follows "only its own interests" regarding immigration. In 2016 she advocated its cooperation with AfD in order to defend the European Christian values of the West.

References

External links

 PURinvent
  National board of the Alternative for Germany

1975 births
Living people
People from Dresden
People from Bezirk Dresden
German Lutherans
The Blue Party (Germany) politicians
Members of the Bundestag for Saxony
Members of the Landtag of Saxony
Leaders of political parties in Germany
Women members of State Parliaments in Germany
21st-century German women politicians
21st-century German chemists
German chief executives
21st-century German businesswomen
21st-century German businesspeople
German women chemists
University of Göttingen alumni
Alumni of the University of Reading
Recipients of the Medal of the Order of Merit of the Federal Republic of Germany
Members of the Bundestag 2017–2021
Members of the Bundestag for the Alternative for Germany
Politicians from Brandenburg
20th-century German women politicians